The 1867 Ohio gubernatorial election was held on October 8, 1867. Republican nominee Rutherford B. Hayes defeated Democratic nominee Allen G. Thurman with 50.31% of the vote.

General election

Candidates
Rutherford B. Hayes, Republican 
Allen G. Thurman, Democratic

Results

References

1867
Ohio
Rutherford B. Hayes